Grąd may refer to:

 Grąd, Podlaskie Voivodeship
 Grąd, West Pomeranian Voivodeship